Verni is a surname. Notable people with the surname include:

D. D. Verni (born 1961), American musician, songwriter, and producer
Marco Antonio Verni (born 1976), Chilean shot putter

See also
Verdi (name)